Gray's Reef National Marine Sanctuary is one of the largest near shore live-bottom reefs in the southeastern United States.

Within the 22-square-mile (57 km2) sanctuary, there are both rocky ledges and sandy flat places. The reef's rocky sandstone outcrops, submerged beneath 60 to 70 feet (18 to 21 m) of water, can be as tall as 2 to 3 m and are highly complex. These nooks and crannies provide plenty of places for invertebrates to latch on to and for fish to hide in. Together these animals form a dense tapestry of living creatures that in places completely hides the rock. That gives the habitat of Gray's Reef its common name — a "live bottom".

Researchers from NOAA and the University of Georgia have used the site to study invertebrate and vertebrate paleontology as well as the effects of erosion.

Human occupation

Although Gray's Reef is more than  beyond today's shoreline, and 60 to 70 feet (18 to 21 m) below the Atlantic Ocean, it was once dry land and part of the mainland as recently as 8,000 years ago. Human occupation of this area dates back at least 13,250 years, and coincides with  one of the most dramatic periods of climate change in recent earth history, toward the end of the Ice Age, in the Late Pleistocene epoch. Sea levels were more than 200 feet lower than present levels, and the Atlantic Ocean and Gulf of Mexico shorelines were 100 or more miles seaward of their present locations.  A 2003 research project undertaken by University of Georgia researchers Ervan G, Garrison, Sherri L. Littman, and Megan Mitchell, looked at and reported on the Gray's Reef fossils and artifacts, including artifacts from a period of occupation by Clovis culture and Paleoindian hunters dating back more than 10,000 years.

References

External links
 Official NOAA website: Gray's Reef National Marine Sanctuary
 Rowley, Katie. Gray’s Reef National Marine Sanctuary: Connectivity: Bibliography. Silver Spring, MD: U.S. Department of Commerce, National Oceanic and Atmospheric Administration, Office of Oceanic and Atmospheric Research, NOAA Central Library, 2020.

Protected areas of McIntosh County, Georgia
National Marine Sanctuaries of the United States
Protected areas of Georgia (U.S. state)
Protected areas established in 1981